Axel Thoma (born 5 September 1964) is a German football manager and former player who played as a forward.

References

1964 births
Living people
German footballers
Association football forwards
Bundesliga players
Swiss Super League players
VfB Stuttgart players
FC Schaffhausen players
FC Winterthur players
German football managers
FC Wil managers
Grasshopper Club Zürich non-playing staff
FC Schaffhausen managers
German expatriate footballers
German expatriate sportspeople in Switzerland
Expatriate footballers in Switzerland
Expatriate football managers in Switzerland